Institut Pendidikan Guru Kampus Rajang (English: Institute of Teacher Education Rajang Campus) or IPG Kampus Rajang (formerly known as Institut Pendidikan Guru Malaysia Kampus Rajang, Institut Perguruan Rajang, Maktab Perguruan Rajang and Rejang Teachers College) is a teacher's education institute in Malaysia under the Ministry of Education. The campus is situated in Bintangor, Meradong District, Sarikei Division, Sarawak, East Malaysia.

Principals and Directors

 Mr.K.J.Hayr
 Mr K.B. Radford
 En.Lau Kuok Ding
 En.Mathew Warrier
 En.Peter Bong
 En.Matnor Daim
 En.Encharang Agas
 En.George Ong B.C
 En.Mohd Haji Sabil
 En.Encharang Agas
 Pn.Maria Dris
 En.Nicholas Ugul
 En. Raymond Gai Panting @ Gaie
 Dr Lambat Anak Lindong

External links
Official website
Malay Wikipedia of IPG Kampus Rajang

Education schools in Malaysia
Universities and colleges in Sarawak
1967 establishments in Malaysia
Educational institutions established in 1967